John Young (1936 – 29 January 2013) was an Australian racing cyclist. He finished in second place in the Australian National Road Race Championships in 1960.

References

External links

1936 births
2013 deaths
Australian male cyclists
Place of birth missing